Farzad Ghulam Ataie (born December 30, 1991) is an Afghan footballer who currently plays for Toofaan Harirod F.C. in Afghanistan. He is also a member of the Afghanistan national football team. He wears number 4, and his position on the field is defender.

Career
Ataie is currently playing for Toofaan Harirod F.C. in the Afghan Premier League. He is defender and wears shirt number 4.

International career
Ataie played every match in his country's victory at the 2013 SAFF Championship.  In the semi-final against Nepal he was injured and taken off on an ambulance, but recovered in time to make the final victory against India.

In a friendly match against Kuwait he unfortunately caused two penalty kicks and received a red card.

Honours
Toofan Harirod F.C.
 2012 Afghan Premier League

Afghanistan
 2013 SAFF Championship

References

External links
 

1991 births
Living people
Sportspeople from Herat
Afghan men's footballers
Afghanistan international footballers
Association football defenders
Association football midfielders
Footballers at the 2014 Asian Games
Asian Games competitors for Afghanistan